The tambourine pedal or  tpedal is a percussion attachment for the drumkit to provide sound of a tambourine without the stick click noise. Tpedal is performed by foot on a kick pedal. This instrument is an idiophone percussion.

References
http://www.patentstorm.us/patents/6096957/claims.html

Idiophones
Musical instrument parts and accessories